Fly Products SRL is an Italian aircraft manufacturer based in Grottammare. The company specializes in the design and manufacture of paramotors and powered parachutes.

Aircraft

See also

List of Italian companies

References

External links

Aircraft manufacturers of Italy
Paramotors